The following tables compare general and technical information for a number of GIS vector file format. Please see the individual products' articles for further information. Unless otherwise specified in footnotes, comparisons are based on the stable versions without any add-ons, extensions or external programs.

General information

Feature Types

AutoCAD DXF – contour elevation plots in AutoCAD DXF format (by Autodesk)
Cartesian coordinate system (XYZ) – simple point cloud
Coverage – closed, hybrid vector data storage strategy. Legacy ArcGIS Workstation / ArcInfo format with reduced support in ArcGIS Desktop lineup. (by ESRI)
Geography Markup Language (GML) – XML based open standard for GIS data exchange (by Open Geospatial Consortium)
Simple Features – specification for vector data storage (by Open Geospatial Consortium) that can be used in a GML container
GeoJSON – open, lightweight format based on JSON, used by many open source GIS packages
GeoMedia – Microsoft Access based format for spatial vector storage (by Intergraph)
ISFC – MicroStation based CAD solution attaching vector elements to a relational Microsoft Access database (by Intergraph)
MapInfo TAB format – format using TAB, DAT, ID and MAP files (by MapInfo Corporation)
National Transfer Format (NTF) – National Transfer Format (mostly used by the UK Ordnance Survey)
Shapefile – open, hybrid vector data format using SHP, SHX and DBF files (by ESRI)
Spatial Data File – high-performance geodatabase format, native to MapGuide (by Autodesk)
TIGER – Topologically Integrated Geographic Encoding and Referencing
Vector Product Format – National Geospatial-Intelligence Agency (NGA)'s format of vectored data for large geographic databases

References

Comparisons of computer file formats